Lee Alexander McQueen  (17 March 1969 – 11 February 2010) was a British fashion designer and couturier. He founded his own Alexander McQueen label in 1992, and was chief designer at Givenchy from 1996 to 2001. His achievements in fashion earned him four British Designer of the Year awards (1996, 1997, 2001 and 2003), as well as the CFDA's International Designer of the Year award in 2003. McQueen died by suicide in 2010 at the age of 40, at his home in Mayfair, London, shortly after the death of his mother.

McQueen had a background in tailoring before he studied fashion and embarked on a career as a designer. His MA graduation collection caught the attention of fashion editor Isabella Blow, who became his patron. McQueen's early designs, particularly the radically low-cut "bumster" trousers, gained him recognition as an enfant terrible in British fashion. In 2000, McQueen sold 51% of his company to the Gucci Group, which established boutiques for his label worldwide and expanded its product range. Following his death, longtime collaborator Sarah Burton took over as creative director of his label.

As a designer, McQueen was known for sharp tailoring, historicism, and imaginative designs that often verged into the controversial. He explored themes such as romanticism, sexuality, and death, and many collections had autobiographical elements. Among his best-known individual designs are the bumsters, the skull scarf, and the armadillo shoes. McQueen's catwalk shows were noted for their drama and theatricality, and they often ended with elements of performance art, such as a model being spray painted by robots (No. 13, Spring/Summer 1999), or a life-size illusion of Kate Moss (The Widows of Culloden, Autumn/Winter 2006).

McQueen's legacy in fashion and culture is extensive. His designs were showcased in two retrospective exhibitions: Alexander McQueen: Savage Beauty (2011 and 2015) and Lee Alexander McQueen: Mind, Mythos, Muse (2022). He remains the subject of journalistic and academic analysis, including the book Gods and Kings (2015) by fashion journalist Dana Thomas and the documentary film McQueen (2018).

Early life and education
Alexander McQueen was born on 17 March 1969 at University Hospital Lewisham in Lewisham, London, to Ronald and Joyce McQueen, the youngest of six children. His Scottish father worked as a  taxi driver, and his mother a social science teacher.  It was reported that he grew up in a council flat, but, in fact, the McQueens moved to a terraced house in Stratford in his first year. McQueen attended Carpenters Road Primary School, before going to Rokeby School. He was interested in clothes from a young age. As the youngest of six children, McQueen began experimenting with fashion by making dresses for his three sisters. His earliest fashion memory reaches back to when he was just three years old, drawing a dress on the wall of his East London family home. He was also fascinated by birds and was a member of the Young Ornithologists' Club; later, in his professional career, he often used birds as motifs in his designs.

McQueen left school aged 16 in 1985 with only one O-level in art, took a course in tailoring at Newham College and went on to serve a two-year apprenticeship on coat-making with Savile Row tailors Anderson & Sheppard, before joining Gieves & Hawkes for a while as a pattern cutter. The skills he learned as an apprentice on Savile Row helped earn him a reputation in the fashion world as an expert in creating an impeccably tailored look. McQueen later claimed that he had sewed obscenities into the lining of suits made for Prince Charles, although a recall of suits made by Anderson & Sheppard to check found no evidence of this. While serving his apprenticeship, McQueen also attended the Rosetta Art Centre. After Saville Row, he worked briefly for the theatrical costumiers Angels and Bermans, making costumes for shows such as Les Misérables. When he was 20, he worked for Koji Tatsuno, and then Romeo Gigli in Milan before returning to London to go to Central Saint Martins College of Art and Design.

McQueen initially applied for a job as a pattern cutter tutor at Central Saint Martins, which he failed to get as he was aged 21 and too young to teach students of his own age. However, based on the strength of his portfolio, Bobby Hillson, the Head of the Masters course at St Martins, encouraged McQueen to enrol as a student instead. He received his master's degree in fashion design and his 1992 MA graduation collection, titled Jack the Ripper Stalks His Victims, was bought in its entirety by magazine editor Isabella Blow. Through the early days of McQueen's career, Isabella Blow helped pave the way using her unique style and contacts to help McQueen. She was in many ways his mentor, which grew into a close friendship.

Blow was said to have persuaded McQueen to use his middle name Alexander when he subsequently launched his fashion career.  Another suggestion was that he used his middle name so as not to lose his unemployment benefits for which he was registered while still a struggling young designer under the name of Lee McQueen. McQueen had said that he refused to be photographed in his early career because he did not want to be recognised in the dole office. In the 2018 documentary McQueen, his boyfriend and assistant designer in the early days, Andrew Groves, said that McQueen dictated that they could only show him from behind to avoid being identified and losing his unemployment benefitshis only significant means of income at that time.

Career
In 1992, McQueen started his own label, and for a time he lived in the basement of Blow's house in Belgravia while it was under renovation. In 1993, he relocated to set up his studio in Hoxton Square, an area that also housed other new designers including Hussein Chalayan and Pauric Sweeney. His first collection after graduation, the Taxi Driver collection inspired by the Martin Scorsese's film, was organised by the British Fashion Council for young designers without runway shows, and presented on a clothes rack in a small room at the Ritz Hotel. He introduced the "bumsters" in this collection, but the collection was never photographed as all the clothes were stolen after the presentation. In his early collections, McQueen sewed locks of his own hair in perspex onto the clothes to serve as his label.

Early runway shows

McQueen's first professional runway show in 1993, the Spring/Summer 1994's Nihilism collection, was held at the Bluebird Garage in Chelsea. His early runway collections developed his reputation for controversy and shock tactics, earning him the title "L'enfant terrible" and "the hooligan of English fashion". McQueen's Nihilism collection, with some models looking bruised and bloodied in see-through clothes and extremely low-cut bumster trousers, was described by journalist Marion Hume of The Independent as "theatre of cruelty" and "a horror show".

McQueen's second runway show was for the Banshee collection. Shortly after creating this collection. McQueen met Katy England, his soon to be "right hand woman", outside of a "high profile fashion show" trying to "blag her way in". He promptly asked her to join him for his following collection, The Birds, as "creative director"; thereafter she continued to work with McQueen, serving as his "second opinion". The Birds, which was named after Alfred Hitchcock's 1963 film and held at Kings Cross, had a roadkill theme featuring clothes with tyre marks and the Corsetier Mr Pearl in an 18-inch waist corset.

McQueen's "bumsters" were a common feature of his early shows. Although derided by some and attracted many comments and debate, it spawned a trend in low-rise jeans, especially after Madonna wore one in an MTV advert in 1994. Michael Oliveira-Salac, the director of Blow PR and a friend of McQueen's said, "The bumster for me is what defined McQueen."

Highland Rape

McQueen's fourth runway show for his Autumn/Winter collection of 1995 brought McQueen to the world's attention. The collection, titled Highland Rape referring to the Highland Clearances of Scotland, was controversial. Some models on the runway wore clothes that were slashed and torn, and in tatters of lace with spatters of fake blood.  Reviewers have interpreted it as being about women who were raped, and criticised what they saw as misogyny and the glamorisation of rape. McQueen objected to such interpretation, arguing that it referred to "England's rape of Scotland", and was intended to counter other designers' romantic depiction of Scottish culture. As for the charge of misogyny, he said he aimed to empower women and for people to be afraid of the women he dressed.

McQueen continued to attract criticisms of misogyny in some of his later shows for designs that some considered degrading to women. In La Poupée (Spring/Summer 1997) inspired by Hans Bellmer's The Doll, McQueen placed models including the black model Debra Shaw in metal restraints, which observers took to mean slavery, while the silver mouthpiece ins Eshu (Autumn/Winter 2000) forced the wearer to bare her teeth. Similarly the sex-doll lips makeup of the models in The Horn of Plenty (Autumn/Winter 2009–10) was also criticised as being ugly and misogynistic. The fashion writer of the Daily Mail called McQueen "the designer who hates women".

McQueen followed Highland Rape with The Hunger (Spring/Summer 1996) and Dante (Autumn/Winter 1996). Dante further raised his international profile, and the collection was shown twice; first in Christ Church, Spitalfields, London, later in a disused synagogue in New York, both attended by large enthusiastic crowds. McQueen won his first British Designer of the Year award in 1996.

McQueen's increasing prominence led to a number of projects for music artists.  In 1996, he designed the wardrobe for David Bowie's tour of 1997, such as the Union Jack coat worn by Bowie on the cover of his album Earthling. Icelandic singer Björk sought McQueen's work for the cover of her album Homogenic in 1997. McQueen also directed the music video for her song "Alarm Call" from the same album and later contributed the iconic topless dress to her video for "Pagan Poetry".

Givenchy appointment

McQueen was appointed head designer of Givenchy in 1996 to succeed John Galliano who had moved to Dior. Hubert de Givenchy, founder of the label known for its elegant couture, criticised McQueen's appointment, describing it as a "total disaster". In turn, upon his arrival at Givenchy, McQueen insulted the founder by calling him "irrelevant". McQueen's debut show for Givenchy, Spring Summer 1997, featured Greek mythology-inspired gold and white designs. Although beautiful, the collection was considered a failure by some critics in contrast to the praise lavished on John Galliano's debut collection for Dior. McQueen himself said to Vogue in October 1997 that the collection was "crap". McQueen had toned down his designs at Givenchy, although he continued to indulge his rebellious streak. Givenchy designs released by Vogue Patterns during this period may be credited to the late designer.

McQueen's relationship with Givenchy was fraught, and he left in March 2001 after his contract ended, with McQueen arguing that Givenchy had started to 'constrain' his creativity.

It's a Jungle out There

Five weeks after his criticised debut for Givenchy, McQueen staged his own show titled It's a Jungle out There, which was inspired by nature. The title was a response to the criticism he received; according to McQueen, after he watched a nature documentary about gazelles being hunted by lions: 'That's me!' Someone's chasing me all the time, and, if I'm caught, they'll pull me down. Fashion is a jungle full of nasty, bitchy hyenas.". Model wore eye makeup to resemble gazelles and clothes with horns in the show. This collection, presented at London's Borough Market, was judged a triumph, Amy Spindler of New York Times, who had criticised his Givenchy debut, wrote that McQueen was "fashion's closest thing to a rock star. He isn't just part of the London scene; he is the scene.".  The London show restored his reputation and he went on to produce a number of well-received collections for Givenchy.

McQueen staged many of his shows in an unusual or dramatic fashion. His Spring/Summer 1998 Untitled collection (originally titled "Golden Shower" until the sponsor objected) was presented on a catwalk showered with water in yellow light, while the following Joan (after Joan of Arc) ended with a masked model standing in a ring of fire.

No. 13

A catwalk show that received widespread media attention was the Spring/Summer 99 collection No. 13 (it was his 13th collection), which was held in a warehouse in London on 27 September 1998. It took inspiration from William Morris and the Arts and Crafts movement, with its concern for handcraft. Some of the dresses incorporated Morris-inspired embroidery, and the show featured double amputee Aimee Mullins in a pair of prosthetic legs intricately hand-carved in ash. The climax of the show, however, provided a counter-point to the anti-industrial ethic of the Arts and Crafts movement. It featured Shalom Harlow in a white dress spray-painted in yellow and black by two robotic arms from a car manufacturing plant. It is considered one of the most memorable finales in fashion history.

The following Autumn/Winter 99 collection, The Overlook (titled after the Overlook Hotel from Stanley Kubrick's film The Shining) featured winter snowy scene with ice-skaters and presented clothes mostly in white and grey. A notable creation in show was the Coil Corset made in collaboration with jeweller Shaun Leane, who also crafted many other pieces for McQueen, including a Spine Corset (Untitled Spring/Summer 1998) and a yashmak in aluminium and crystal (Eye, Spring/Summer 2000). The Coil Corset, an expansion of the idea of a coiled neck-piece made by Leane for It's a Jungle Out There, was made out of aluminium rings. It was sold in 2017 for $807,000.

McQueen held his first runway show in New York in 1999, titled Eye (Spring/Summer 2000). The theme was on West relation to Islam and featured designs that were sexualised version of traditional Islamic dress, which was poorly-received by the critics. The show ended with models in niqāb and burqa floating above spikes that had appeared out of water.

Voss
One of McQueen's most celebrated and dramatic catwalk shows was his 2001 Spring/Summer collection, named Voss after a Norwegian town known for its wildlife habitat. Nature was reflected in the natural material used in some of his clothes such as ostrich feathers, but more unusual were outfits made out of razor clam and mussel shells.

The centre piece tableau that dominated the show was an enormous dark glass box within a larger glass box. Inside the inner dark glass case was an interior filled with moths and, at the centre, a naked model on a chaise lounge with her face obscured by a gas mask. The tableau was revealed when the glass walls of the inner box fell away towards the end of the show and smashed onto the ground.  McQueen said that the tableau was based on the Joel Peter Witkin image Sanitarium. The model chosen by McQueen to be the centre of the show was the British writer Michelle Olley. The British fashion photographer Nick Knight said of the VOSS show on his SHOWstudio.com blog: "It was probably one of the best pieces of Fashion Theatre I have ever witnessed."

Because the room outside the box was lit and the inside of the box was unlit before the show started, the glass walls appeared as large mirrors, so that the seated audience saw only their own reflection.  Alexander McQueen later described his thoughts on the idea used during VOSS of forcing his audience to stare at their own reflection in the mirrored walls for over an hour before the show started:

Gucci partnership
Before his contract with Givenchy had finished, McQueen signed a deal with Givenchy's rival Gucci in 2000, daring Givenchy to fire him. Gucci bought 51% of McQueen's company with McQueen remaining its creative director, and the deal allowed McQueen to expand his own Alexander McQueen label. In the following years a number of Alexander McQueen boutiques opened in cities around the world, and the label also extended into perfume, eyewear and accessories, trainers, as well as a menswear line.

McQueen continued to present his runway shows in an unconventional manner for which he had become known. The Autumn 2001 show, his last show in London before moving to Paris, featured a merry-go-round with models in clown make-ups dragging along a golden skeleton; the Autumn/Winter 2002 Supercalifragilisticexpialidocious collection was shown with live caged wolves and a black parachute cape inspired by Tim Burton; the Autumn/Winter 2003 Scanners was presented in a snowy wasteland setting with models walking along a wind tunnel; and the Autumn 2004 show was a re-enactment of dance scenes from the Sydney Pollack's film They Shoot Horses, Don't They?, choreographed for the show by Michael Clark.  For the spring 2005 It's Only a Game collection, he presented a human chess game,  and his autumn 2006 show The Widows of Culloden, featured a life-sized illusion of Kate Moss, an English supermodel, dressed in yards of rippling fabric.

McQueen also became known for using skulls in his designs. A scarf bearing the skull motif, which first appeared in the Irere Spring/Summer collection of 2003, became a celebrity must-have and was copied around the world.

Although McQueen had incorporated menswear into many of his previous catwalk shows, for example Spring/Summer 98, it was only in 2004 that a separate menswear collection was introduced with his first menswear runway show in Milan's menswear event. He was named GQ magazine's Designer of the Year in 2004.

In 2007, McQueen dedicated his Spring 2008 collection, La Dame Bleue, to Isabella Blow, who had committed suicide earlier that year. The show included works by his long-time collaborator Philip Treacy, another of Blow's protégé. The collection had a bird theme and featured brightly coloured clothes with feathers.

McQueen produced a well-received collection, The Girl Who Lived in the Tree, for Autumn/Winter 2008. It was based on a story McQueen created about a feral girl who lived in a tree but transformed into a princess and marry a prince to become a queen. He took inspiration from the Queens of England and the British Raj and Empire to create a romantic and regal collection. The first half of the show focused on dark decorative dresses over petticoats, which became lighter and more lavish in the second half.
 
The Spring/Summer 2009 collection, Natural Dis-tinction Un-natural Selection, was inspired by Charles Darwin who was the creator of the theory of natural selection, and the impact of industrial revolution on nature. It was presented on a runway filled with taxidermied animals. The show presented structured clothes that featured prints with images of natural materials, as well as crystal-encrusted bodysuits and bell jar-shaped dresses.

In 2009, McQueen also collaborated with dancer Sylvie Guillem, director  Robert Lepage and choreographer Russell Maliphant, designing wardrobe for a theater show  "Eonnagata", which premiered at Sadler's Wells theatre in London.

Plato's Atlantis 

Alexander McQueen's last appearance on a fashion show was in Plato's Atlantis, presented during Paris Fashion Week on 6 October 2009. This Spring/Summer 2010 collection was inspired by nature and the post-human manifesto featuring 46 full looks depicted with sea creature and reptile prints.  McQueen installed two large cameras on the runway, both of which moved back and forth, documenting and broadcasting the entire show live on SHOWstudio. Plato's Atlantis was the first fashion show by any designer to be streamed live over the internet, although the website streaming it crashed after Lady Gaga tweeted about the show before it started.

The show began with a video of Raquel Zimmerman lying naked on sand with snakes on her body. The fashion show and the collection addresses Charles Darwin's theory of evolution. as well as current global warming issues. The fantasy collection, named after Plato's island that sunk in the sea, envisaged a future where humans are forced to evolve from living on land to living in water in order to survive. The color scheme changed during the show from green and brown (land) to blue and acqua (ocean). The models exhibited an androgynous look (which represents McQueen's evolutionary themes), as well as possessing post-human characteristics. The prints shifted from reptilian to prints of water creatures such as jellyfish and stingrays. The collection's final silhouettes gave the models marine features while the McQueen's signature armadillo shoe also transformed the appearance of the models' anatomic foot. Plato's Atlantis was yet another way in which McQueen fused fashion with technology.  The finale of the show was accompanied by the debut of Lady Gaga's single "Bad Romance".

Final show

At the time of Alexander McQueen's death, he had 16 pieces that were eighty-percent finished for his Autumn/Winter collection. These outfits were completed by his design team and shown in seven presentations to small groups of specially invited audience. This collection, unofficially titled Angels and Demons, was first shown during Paris Fashion Week on 8 March 2010, to a select handful of fashion editors in a mirrored, gilded salon at the 18th-century Hôtel de Clermont-Tonnerre. Some fashion editors said the show was hard to watch because it showed how McQueen was obsessed with the afterlife.

The clothes presented had a medieval and religious look. Basic colours that were repetitively used were red, gold and silver with detailed embroidery. The last outfit presented has a coat made of gold feathers (shown left).  His models were accessorised to show his love for theatrical imagery. "Each piece is unique, as was he", McQueen's fashion house said in a statement that was released with the collection.

After company owner Gucci confirmed that the brand would continue, McQueen's long-term assistant Sarah Burton was named as the new creative director of Alexander McQueen in May 2010. In September 2010, Burton presented her first womenswear collection in Paris.

Accomplishments

Some of McQueen's accomplishments included being one of the youngest designers to achieve the title "British Designer of the Year", which he won four times between 1996 and 2003; he was also appointed a CBE and named International Designer of the Year by the Council of Fashion Designers in 2003.

McQueen has been credited with bringing drama and extravagance to the catwalk. He used new technology and innovation to add a different twist to his shows and often shocked and surprised audiences. The silhouettes that he created have been credited for adding a sense of fantasy and rebellion to fashion.

Company

December 2000 saw a new partnership for McQueen, with the Gucci Group's acquiring 51% of his company and McQueen's serving as Creative Director. Plans for expansion included the opening of stores in London, Milan, and New York, and the launch of his perfumes Kingdom and, most recently, My Queen. In 2005, McQueen collaborated with Puma to create a special line of trainers for the shoe brand. In 2006, he launched McQ, a younger, more renegade lower-priced line for men and women.  Among his most popular design is the skull scarf first created in 2003.

By the end of 2007, Alexander McQueen had boutiques in London, New York, Los Angeles, Milan, and Las Vegas. Celebrity patrons, including Nicole Kidman, Penélope Cruz, Sarah Jessica Parker, and Rihanna, Monica Brown and J-pop queens, such as Ayumi Hamasaki, Namie Amuro, and Koda Kumi, have frequently been spotted wearing Alexander McQueen clothing to events.  The number of McQueen stores worldwide had increased to 100 by the end of 2020, with revenues estimated to be €500m in 2020.

McQueen became one of several designers to participate in MAC's promotion of cosmetic releases created by fashion designers. The collection was released on 11 October 2007 and reflected the looks used on the Autumn/Winter McQueen catwalk created by makeup artist Charlotte Tilbury. The inspiration for the collection was the 1963 Elizabeth Taylor movie Cleopatra, and thus the models sported intense blue, green, and teal eyes with strong black liner extended Egyptian-style. McQueen handpicked the makeup.

Chronology
The chronology of the fashion shows for women conducted during McQueen's lifetime included 36 collections counting his graduate school collection and his posthumous last collection which included many items of his own design.

Womenswear mainline catwalk collections:

 1992 Graduate Collection – Jack The Ripper Stalks His Victims 
 Autumn/Winter 1993 – Taxi Driver 
 Spring/Summer 1994 – Nihilism 
 Autumn/Winter 1994 – Banshee 
 Spring/Summer 1995 – The Birds 
 Autumn/Winter 1995 – Highland Rape
 Spring/Summer 1996 – The Hunger
 Autumn/Winter 1996 – Dante
 Spring/Summer 1997 – Bellmer La Poupee
 Autumn/Winter 1997 – It's A Jungle Out There
 Spring/Summer 1998 – Untitled (Originally The Golden Shower)
 Autumn/Winter 1998 – Joan
 Spring/Summer 1999 – No. 13
 Autumn/Winter 1999 – The Overlook
 Spring/Summer 2000 – Eye
 Autumn/Winter 2000 – Eshu
 Spring/Summer 2001 – Voss
 Autumn/Winter 2001 – What A Merry-Go-Round
 Spring/Summer 2002 – The Dance of the Twisted Bull

 Autumn/Winter 2002 – Supercalifragilistic
 Spring/Summer 2003 – Irere
 Autumn/Winter 2003 – Scanners
 Spring/Summer 2004 – Deliverance
 Autumn/Winter 2004 – Pantheon ad Lucem"
 Spring/Summer 2005 – It's Only a Game Autumn/Winter 2005 – The Man Who Knew Too Much Spring/Summer 2006 – Neptune Autumn/Winter 2006 – The Widows of Culloden Spring/Summer 2007 – Sarabande Autumn/Winter 2007 – In Memory of Elizabeth Howe, Salem, 1692 Spring/Summer 2008 – La Dame Bleue Autumn/Winter 2008 – The Girl Who Lived in the Tree Spring/Summer 2009 – Natural Dis-tinction Un-natural Selection Autumn/Winter 2009 – The Horn of Plenty Spring/Summer 2010 – Plato's Atlantis Autumn/Winter 2010 – Angels & Demons

Popular culture
 
McQueen have produced works for music artists such as David Bowie and Björk which were used in their album covers and tours.
Pieces designed by Alexander McQueen have been incorporated in the music videos of Björk, Hamasaki, and Lady Gaga. His designs for the Plato's Atlantis collection, including one of his most notable creations the armadillo shoes, were worn by Lady Gaga in her video for "Bad Romance".

A leather costume designed by McQueen was worn by Janet Jackson in her halftime show at Super Bowl XXXVIII in 2004, which created a controversy when her breast was briefly exposed in an incident described by Justin Timberlake as a "wardrobe malfunction".

Personal life
McQueen was openly gay and said he realized his sexual orientation when he was six years old. He told his family when he was 18 and, after a rocky period, they accepted it. He described coming out at a young age by saying, "I was sure of myself and my sexuality and I've got nothing to hide. I went straight from my mother's womb onto the gay parade". Later in life he revealed to his family that he had been sexually abused by his brother-in-law when he was young.

In 2000, McQueen had a marriage ceremony with his partner George Forsyth, a documentary filmmaker, on a yacht in Ibiza. Kate Moss and Annabelle Neilson were bridesmaids. The marriage was not official, as same-sex marriage in Spain was not legal at that time. The relationship ended a year later, with the two maintaining a close friendship.

McQueen was HIV positive.

McQueen was an avid scuba diver and used his passion as a source of inspiration in his designs, including spring 2010's "Plato's Atlantis". Much of his diving was done around the Maldives.

McQueen received press attention after the May 2007 suicide of magazine editor Isabella Blow. Rumours were published that there was a rift between McQueen and Blow at the time of her death, focusing on McQueen's under-appreciation of Blow. McQueen denied these rumours.

Death and memorial
On 3 February 2010, McQueen wrote on his Twitter page that his mother had died the day before, adding: "RIP mumxxxxxxxxxxxxxxxxxxxxxxxxxxx." Four days later, he wrote that he had an "awful week" but said "friends have been great", adding "now I have to somehow pull myself together".

On the morning of 11 February 2010, his housekeeper found McQueen hanged at his home in Green Street, London W1. Paramedics were called and they pronounced him dead at the scene.

His family was notified, and his company released a statement announcing his death:

McQueen left a note saying, "Look after my dogs, sorry, I love you, Lee." The Metropolitan Police stated that the note was not suspicious, but did not make a confirmation that the death was a suicide. On 17 February 2010, Westminster Coroner's Court was told that a post-mortem examination found that McQueen's death was due to asphyxiation and hanging. The inquest was adjourned until 28 April 2010, where McQueen's death was officially recorded as suicide. The coroner, Paul Knapman, reported finding "a significant level of cocaine, sleeping pills, and tranquillizers in the blood samples taken after the designer's death."

David LaChapelle, a friend of the designer, said that McQueen "was doing a lot of drugs and was very unhappy" at the time of his death. Stephen Pereira, McQueen's psychiatrist, said he had mixed anxiety and depressive disorder for at least three years and had twice taken drug overdoses as "cries for help." He had taken drug overdoses in May and July 2009. Pereira also said that McQueen had repeatedly missed psychiatric sessions, adding that there had been "enormous difficulty in getting him to personally, physically come to appointments."

While McQueen's death came, by coincidence, just days before London Fashion Week, he was not scheduled to appear there.

McQueen's funeral took place on 25 February 2010 at St. Paul's Church, Knightsbridge, West London. His ashes were later scattered in Skye at Kilmuir. His Skye ancestry had been a strong influence in his life and work.

A memorial was held for McQueen at St. Paul's Cathedral on 20 September 2010. It was attended by Björk, Kate Moss, Sarah Jessica Parker, Naomi Campbell, Stella McCartney, Daphne Guinness, Sam Taylor-Johnson, Aaron Taylor-Johnson, Lady Gaga and Anna Wintour amongst 2,500 other invited guests. On 18 February 2010, Robert Polet, the president and chief executive of the Gucci Group, announced that the Alexander McQueen business would carry on without its founder and creative director. Close friend Björk performed a version of "Gloomy Sunday" while dressed in a McQueen gown.
	
The BBC reported that McQueen had reserved £50,000 of his wealth for his pet dogs so they could live in the lap of luxury for the rest of their lives. He also bequeathed £100,000 each to four charities; these include the Battersea Dogs and Cats Home in South London, and the Blue Cross animal welfare charity in Burford, Oxfordshire.

Legacy and tributes

On 16 February 2010, pop musician and friend Lady Gaga performed an acoustic, jazz rendition of her hit single "Telephone" and segued into "Dance in the Dark" at the 2010 Brit Awards. During the performance, Gaga paid tribute to McQueen, by dedicating a song to him. She also commemorated McQueen after accepting her award for Best International Artist, Best International Female, and Best International Album. Gaga dedicated a song to him, titled "Fashion of His Love", on the special edition of her third album, Born This Way. R&B singer Monica dedicated her music video "Everything To Me" to McQueen. Björk, wearing a McQueen outfit, sang "Gloomy Sunday" at the memorial at St. Paul's Cathedral in London. Various other musicians, who were friends and collaborators with McQueen, paid tribute following his death, including Kanye West, Courtney Love, and Katy Perry.

In March 2010, celebrities including Naomi Campbell, Kate Moss and Annabelle Neilson, among others, paid visual tribute to McQueen by wearing his distinctive 'manta' dresses. The 'manta' dresses, inspired by a scuba-diving holiday McQueen took to the Maldives in 2009, came from McQueen's 'Plato's Atlantis' collection of Spring-Summer 2010 which was at the time currently available to purchase. 'Manta' dresses had been worn by celebrities such as Daphne Guinness, Noot Seear, Anna Paquin, and Lily Cole prior to his death, and following the announcement that he had died, remaining stocks sold out despite prices starting at £2,800.

In 2012, McQueen was among the British cultural icons selected by artist Sir Peter Blake to appear in a new version of his most famous artwork—the Beatles' Sgt. Pepper's Lonely Hearts Club Band album cover—to celebrate the British cultural figures of his life that he most admires. McQueen is also given homage in the popular MMO World of Warcraft. There is an NPC dedicated to Alexander McQueen that is a Tailoring Trainer named Alexandra McQueen. This trainer is also the only one on the horde side that gives a special quest Cloth Scavenging. A dress designed by McQueen featured on a commemorative UK postage stamp issued by the Royal Mail in 2012 celebrating Great British Fashion.

In 2016, a conceptual art piece made by Tina Gorjanc highlighted the possibility for corporations to copyright another human's DNA. She created a series out of pig leather tanned and tattooed to appear similar to McQueen's skin. She filed patents for her method of replicating McQueen's skin in the lab, and displayed these patents along with the leather collection. McQueen's family stated that they did not condone the use of his DNA for fashion projects but acknowledged that this project is exactly the sort of fashion experimentation he would have enjoyed.

 Museum exhibitions 
The Metropolitan Museum of Art in New York City hosted a posthumous exhibition of McQueen's work in 2011 titled Savage Beauty. The exhibition's elaborate staging includes unique architectural finishes and soundtracks for each room.  Despite being open for only three months, it was one of the most popular exhibitions in the museum's history. The exhibition was so successful that Alexander McQueen fans and industry professionals worldwide began rallying at Change.org to "Please Make Alexander McQueen's Savage Beauty a Traveling Exhibition" to bring honour to McQueen and see his vision become a reality: to share his work with the entire world. The exhibition then appeared in London's Victoria & Albert Museum between 14 March and 2 August 2015. It sold over 480,000 tickets, making it the most popular show ever staged at that museum.

A second exhibition, Lee Alexander McQueen: Mind, Mythos, Muse, was staged at the Los Angeles County Museum of Art and the National Gallery of Victoria in 2022. It juxtaposed McQueen's designs with art and objects from the museum's collection to explore how McQueen's body of work drew from diverse sources across art history.

 In media 
McQueen has been the subject of several books, both biographical and photographic. The first major biography was Blood Beneath the Skin (2015) by author Andrew Wilson. Gods and Kings (2015) by fashion journalist Dana Thomas discusses his life and work in conjunction with John Galliano, another controversial British designer of the 1990s.

In February 2015, on the fifth anniversary of McQueen's death, the James Phillips play McQueen premiered. The play is set over one night in London and follows a girl who breaks into the designer's home to steal a dress and is caught by McQueen. The production takes inspiration from his imaginative runway shows and was directed by John Caird. It has been described by McQueen's sister Janet as "true to his spirit". Stephen Wight and Dianna Agron played the leading roles.

In 2016, it was announced that Jack O'Connell would play McQueen in a biographical film based on Blood Beneath the Skin. English filmmaker Andrew Haigh was slated to direct. In 2017, both O'Connell and Haigh stated that they were no longer involved in the project.

On 8 June 2018, the documentary McQueen, written and directed by Ian Bonhôte and Peter Ettedgui, was released in the UK. It was described by Harper's Bazaar as "among the most accurate, sensitive, and moving. Using his collections as cornerstones, the documentary features candid interviews with colleagues, friends and even family of McQueen, who was known as Lee to the people he loved." The film was favourably reviewed, earning a score of 84 on the critical aggregator website Metacritic, indicating "universal acclaim", as well as a 99% rating on Rotten Tomatoes, with a Critics Consensus reading, "McQueen offers an intimate, well-sourced, and overall moving look at a young life and brilliant career that were tragically cut short."

References

Further reading

Biographies
 Bolton, Andrew (2010), Alexander McQueen: Savage Beauty, Metropolitan Museum of Art, 
 Knox, Kristin (2010), Alexander Mcqueen: Genius of a Generation, A & C Black Publishers Ltd, 
 Deniau, Anne (2012), Love Looks Not with the Eyes: Thirteen Years with Lee Alexander McQueen, Harry N. Abrams, 
 Frankel, Susannah; and Waplington, Nick (2013), Alexander McQueen: Working Process, Damiani, 
 Watt, Judith (2013), Alexander McQueen. Harper Design (27 August 2013), 256 pages.
 Thomas, Dana (2015), Gods and Kings: The Rise and Fall of Alexander McQueen and John Galliano'', Penguin Press,

External links

Alexander McQueen – Daily Telegraph obituary
In pictures:Alexander McQueen exhibition – The BBC – Entertainment and Arts
Metropolitan Museum of Art retrospective

1969 births
2010 deaths
2010 suicides
20th-century English businesspeople
Alumni of Central Saint Martins
Commanders of the Order of the British Empire
English fashion designers
English people of Scottish descent
Gay businessmen
LGBT fashion designers
English gay artists
English LGBT businesspeople
LGBT-related suicides
People from Stratford, London
People with HIV/AIDS
Kering people
Suicides by hanging in England
Suicides in Westminster
21st-century English LGBT people